is a park on the border of Mitake, Kani District and Mizunami in Gifu Prefecture, Japan. It is located in Hida-Kisogawa Quasi-National Park. Oniiwa is a Japanese government designated Place of Scenic Beauty and Natural Monument.

Overview 

It is located near the source of the Kani River, a tributary of the Kiso River. It has massive granite rocks that have been eroded over a period of millions of years. There are also many rhododendrons and Japanese maples, and it is a famous spot for foliage in autumn. Near the  summit, a waterfall will appear a few times a year after heavy rainfall.

Oniiwa Onsen, a sulfur and uranium mineral spring, is nearby.

It was discovered in 2016 that rock climbing wedges had been driven into rocks at Oniiwa Park within Mitake. The Japan Free Climbing Association, as well as meeting with the town of Mitake, Gifu, and the Agency for Cultural Affairs, performed work on March 27, 2018 to remove the wedges or otherwise to repair the places where the wedges could not be removed.

Origin of the name "Oniiwa" 
The legend is that there was a demon named  who lived in the area, and so it came to be called . Seki no Tarō lived around the year 1200, and terrorized residents and travelers on the Tōsandō with evil deeds. He was killed by soldiers dispatched under the orders of Emperor Go-Shirakawa.

Fukuoni Matsuri 

A Setsubun festival that has been held since 1986 on the first Sunday in February, around February 3rd. The legend goes that Seki no Taro was exorcised and resurrected as a good-luck demon. So that the demons will bring good luck, when scattering beans, instead of the normal chant, everyone says .

Goshuin 
Planned by the Gifu Community Development Association's . As of November 2019 Oniiwa Park is one of 13 places that have "Golden Goshuin". These are special goshuin decorated with gold that are only available on the last Friday of each month, or "Premium Friday". They are issued at the goshuin booth in Oniiwa Drive-in. It uses a proprietary ink that looks gold from the front and red from the back.

Access 
If by train, take a taxi from either Mitake Station on the Meitetsu Hiromi Line or Tokishi Station on the JR Chūō Main Line. If by highway, get off the Chūō Expressway at Toki IC or the Tōkai-Kanjō Expressway at Kani-Mitake IC and then to Route 21.

Footnotes

Notes

References

See also 

 List of Places of Scenic Beauty of Japan (Gifu)
 Monuments of Japan

External links 

 Oniiwa Onsen Travel Navigator

Mitake, Gifu
Parks and gardens in Gifu Prefecture